Butyriboletus pulchriceps is a fungus of the family Boletaceae native to North America. It was first formally described in 2000 as a member of the genus Boletus, and transferred to Butyriboletus in 2015.

See also
List of North American boletes

References

External links

pulchriceps
Fungi described in 2000
Fungi of North America